Kalmthout is a railway station in the town of Kalmthout, Antwerp, Belgium. The station opened on 26 June 1854 on the Antwerp–Lage Zwaluwe railway, known in Belgium as Line 12.

Train services
The station is served by the following services:

Intercity services (IC-22) Essen - Antwerp - Mechelen - Brussels (weekdays)
Local services (L-22) Roosendaal - Essen - Antwerp - Puurs (weekdays)
Local services (L-22) Roosendaal - Essen - Antwerp (weekends)

External links
Belgian Railways website

Railway stations opened in 1854
Railway stations in Belgium
Railway stations in Antwerp Province
Kalmthout
1854 establishments in Belgium